The National Communications Union (NCU) was a trade union in the United Kingdom.

The union was founded in 1985 when the Post Office Engineering Union and the Postal and Telecommunications Group of the Civil and Public Services Association merged.  In 1995, it merged with the Union of Communication Workers to form the Communication Workers Union.

General secretaries
1985: Bryan Stanley
1986: John Golding
1989: Anthony Young

References

External links
Catalogue of the NCU archives, held at the Modern Records Centre, University of Warwick

Trade unions established in 1985
Trade unions disestablished in 1995
1995 disestablishments in the United Kingdom
Defunct trade unions of the United Kingdom
Communications trade unions
1985 establishments in the United Kingdom